Regina Alexandrova (born 20 June 1967) is a Norwegian politician for the Conservative Party.

A major in the Armed Forces, she located to Troms and served as a member of Bardu municipal council from 207 to 2015. In the 2013 election she was elected as deputy representative to the Parliament of Norway from Troms. From 2013 to 2016 she met regularly for cabinet member Elisabeth Aspaker as a member of the Standing Committee on Foreign Affairs and Defence.

References 

1967 births
Living people
Bulgarian emigrants to Norway
People from Bardu
Norwegian military personnel
Conservative Party (Norway) politicians
Members of the Storting
Troms politicians
21st-century Norwegian politicians
Women members of the Storting